Without a Paddle is a 2004 American adventure comedy film directed by Steven Brill, written by Jay Leggett and Mitch Rouse, and based on a story by Harris Goldberg, Tom Nursall, and Fred Wolf. The film stars Seth Green, Matthew Lillard, Dax Shepard, Ethan Suplee, Abraham Benrubi, Rachel Blanchard, Christina Moore, Bonnie Somerville, Ray Baker and Burt Reynolds. It tells the story of three reunited childhood friends going on a trip up a remote river in order to search for the loot of long-lost airplane hijacker D. B. Cooper.

A direct-to-video sequel, entitled Without a Paddle: Nature's Calling, was released in January 2009.

Plot
12 years after graduating from high school, three friends, Jerry, Dan, and Tom, find out that their childhood friend Billy has died in a parasailing accident. After the funeral, they revisit the group's old tree-house and find a map leading to D. B. Cooper's lost treasure, which Billy had apparently been working on for his entire life. Dan takes a break from his job as a doctor and joins Jerry and Tom on a camping trip to find the treasure.

Canoeing down the river, they eventually stop on the riverbank for the night. They realize that they forgot to bring food, so Tom goes out to catch some fish. However, the activity attracts a grizzly bear and it chases them. When Dan falls, the bear seemingly treats him like a cub until he breaks free, following the others up a tree. In the morning, they find all of their gear has been ripped up and completely destroyed by the bear.

The trio takes off into the river but are unable to read the damaged map, causing them to go the wrong way. They go over a waterfall, and although they survive, their canoe is wrecked. Venturing into the woods with a compass, they find themselves at a pot farm where rednecks Dennis and Elwood, mistake them for thieves and start shooting at them. They escape, burning the pot garden down in the process. This enrages Dennis and Elwood, who decide to hunt them down.

Later, far into the forest, the trio meets hippie girls Flower and Butterfly, who treat them in their tree. Using a radio the farmers find them, but the women drop paper bags full of feces at the farmers to distract them while the trio escapes. They are saved from the thunderstorm by a mountain man who takes them to his hut and provides them with clothes. He later reveals himself to be Del Knox, Cooper's partner before his death.

The next morning, the farmers find them, assaulting the hut. The trio escapes while Del shoots at the two with his dual wield revolvers. The trio stumbles upon the site of Cooper's crash-landing, discovering his skeleton and the suitcase he used to hold the ransom money down an old mine shaft. They realize he burned his share of the money attempting to survive.

As Dan crawls through a small tunnel to find a way out, the farmers find Tom and Jerry, and a fistfight ensues. Eventually, Sheriff Briggs, who had earlier helped the trio, intervenes. He then reveals himself to be the farmers' employer. Jerry arms a grenade taken from Dennis and throws it at the pot dealers. It explodes, causing a tree to fall on the farmers and the sheriff, who are soon arrested.

In the closing scenes, Del gives Tom, Jerry and Dan what's left of D.B's non burnt money ($100,000) but Jerry and Dan decide Tom needs it more than they do, so they let Tom keep it, while Del gives D.B. a proper funeral. Jerry proposes to his girlfriend Denise, Dan starts a relationship with Flower, and Tom becomes a camp counselor for a children's summer camp where he tells his troop an exaggerated version of the trip.

Cast
 Seth Green as Dan Mott
 Jarred Rumbold as young Dan
 Matthew Lillard as Jerry Conlaine
 Andrew Hampton as young Jerry
 Dax Shepard as Tom Marshall
 Matthew Price as young Tom
 Burt Reynolds as Del Knox
 Bonnie Somerville as Denise
 Ethan Suplee as Elwood
 Ray Baker as Hank Briggs
 Abraham Benrubi as Dennis
 Rachel Blanchard as Flower
 Christina Moore as Butterfly
 Antony Starr as Billy Newwood
 Carl Snell as young Billy
 Scott Adsit as Greasy man
 Danielle Cormack as Toni
 Bart the Bear 2 as Grizzly bear
 Frank Welker as Grizzly bear vocal effects

Reception

Box office
Without a Paddle ranked second in its opening weekend behind fellow newcomer Exorcist: The Beginning, earning $13,528,946. It ultimately grossed $58,169,327 in North America and $14,859,863 internationally for a worldwide total of $73,029,190.

Critical response
On Rotten Tomatoes the film has an approval rating of 14% based on 126 reviews, with an average rating of 3.9/10. The website's cercus consensus reads: "Without a Paddle has a few laughs, but not enough to sustain its running time." On Metacritic the film has a weighted average score of 29 out of 100 based on 27 critics, indicating "generally unfavorable reviews". Audiences surveyed by CinemaScore gave the film an average grade of "B+" on an A+ to F scale.

Dennis Harvey of Variety called it: "An unstable—if mostly painless—mix of low comedy, stabs at higher silliness, and schmaltz."

Entertainment Weekly's Scott Brown was more positive and wrote: "There are some genuinely clever moments of physical comedy, and the inevitable crudeness is offset by winning whimsy. Without has all the freshness of moldering Playboys stashed under a mattress, but it evokes what few boys-will-be-boys larks can: chumminess."

Sequel 
A sequel to the film, titled Without a Paddle: Nature's Calling, was released direct-to-video on January 13, 2009. None of the cast and crew from the first film returned.

See also
 Deliverance a 1972 film with a similar plot
 D. B. Cooper in popular culture

References

External links

 

2004 films
2000s adventure comedy films
American adventure comedy films
Films scored by Christophe Beck
Films directed by Steven Brill
American films about cannabis
Films set in Oregon
Films shot in New Zealand
Films with screenplays by Fred Wolf
Treasure hunt films
Paramount Pictures films
River adventure films
Films produced by Donald De Line
2004 comedy films
2000s English-language films
Stoner films
2000s American films